Senator Seabrook may refer to:

Larry Seabrook (born 1951), New York State Senate
Whitemarsh Benjamin Seabrook (1793–1855), South Carolina State Senate